Vinette Robinson (born 1981) is a British actress. Her TV appearances include roles in Sherlock, Black Mirror, and as civil rights campaigner Rosa Parks in the Doctor Who episode "Rosa".

Early life

Robinson was born to a Jamaican father and a British mother. She grew up in Bradford. Robinson went to Primary and Secondary school in Bradford, then did drama in sixth form at Intake High School in Leeds, along with weekly courses at the Scala School of Performing Arts theatre school in Leeds.

Career

Robinson began auditioning when she was thirteen years old; her first audition was for the role of Queen Amidala in the 1999 movie Star Wars: Episode I – The Phantom Menace; a part which ultimately went to Natalie Portman. She made her television debut in The Cops at the age of 17. Following this she spent three years at the Webber Douglas Academy of Dramatic Art, where she was awarded a Laurence Olivier Bursary from the Society of London Theatre. She had a small role as the Jamaican girl in the 2004 film Vera Drake but was given an entire character backstory by the director Mike Leigh.

Her first stage role was in the highly lauded National/Complicite production of Measure for Measure. Following this she was part of the Gunpowder season at the Royal Shakespeare Company where she played the tortured servant May in Rupert Goold's production of Speaking Like Magpies by Frank McGuinness. In 2006 she played Eve in an acclaimed production of Paradise Lost. Commenting on her nude scene, Sheila Tracy of The Stage wrote "one can not imagine the action working in any other way". Her performance in Sugar Mummies that same year led New York to list her as one of "London's hottest young stage actors" in 2007. Following the conclusion of Sugar Mummies, she appeared in a short feature for Time Out, in which she and five other actors were described as "innovative young theatrical talent".

In 2009, she played Josie Porritt in the BBC television series Hope Springs and appeared as newly qualified English teacher Helen Hopewell in eight episodes of Waterloo Roads fifth series. From December 2009 to January 2010, she starred as the maid Florence in the Hampstead Theatre's Darker Shores. In a Daily Telegraph review that rated the play only two stars, Charles Spencer commended Robinson's performance as having "a warmth and emotional openness". Kate Bassett for The Independent on Sunday also praised her, writing that she "copes admirably". In 2010, she starred as police sergeant Sally Donovan in the BBC series Sherlock, continuing her role in the second and third series that aired in January 2012 and December 2013/January 2014.

In 2011, Robinson appeared in Philip Ridley's Tender Napalm, for which she received a "Best Female at The Offie" award. She then went on to play Ophelia in The Young Vic's production of Hamlet, for which she received the Clarence Derwent Award. Her role as Ophelia led to her inclusion in the New York Times Magazine article "Titans of the Stage".

In 2016, she appeared in Hated in the Nation, an episode of the anthology series Black Mirror.

In October 2018, Robinson appeared in the Doctor Who episode "Rosa", as civil rights campaigner Rosa Parks. It was her second appearance in Doctor Who, following her portrayal of the character Abi Lerner in the 2007 episode "42".

In 2019, Robinson appeared briefly in Star Wars: The Rise of Skywalker as a pilot who receives a same-sex kiss, a first for the film franchise. She appeared in the 2021 one-take film Boiling Point for which she received critical acclaim, as well as the BIFA Award for Best Supporting Actress. She portrays a sous chef to an insolent, alcoholic head chef over the course of one hectic night at a busy restaurant.

Theatre

Filmography

Video games

Awards and nominations

References

External links

1981 births
20th-century English actresses
21st-century English actresses
Black British actresses
English television actresses
English stage actresses
English film actresses
Living people
Actresses from Bradford
British people of Jamaican descent